Mikhail Viktorovich Baranovsky (born 4 January 1983) is a Belarusian former professional football player.

Club career
He played three games in the 2007 UEFA Intertoto Cup for FC Shakhtyor Soligorsk.

He played one game for the main squad of FC Rotor Volgograd in the Russian Cup.

Honours
 Russian Second Division Zone West best goalkeeper: 2005.

External links
 
 

1983 births
Living people
People from Dimitrovgrad, Russia
Belarusian footballers
Association football goalkeepers
Belarusian expatriate footballers
Expatriate footballers in Russia
FC Khimki players
FC Baltika Kaliningrad players
FC Shakhtyor Soligorsk players
FC Zhemchuzhina Sochi players
FC Dynamo Bryansk players
FC Rotor Volgograd players
FC Ufa players
FC Sokol Saratov players
FC Slavia Mozyr players